"The Ballad of Ronnie Drew" is a single by U2, The Dubliners, Kíla and A Band of Bowsies. The single was recorded as a charitable project, with proceeds going to the Irish Cancer Society - owing to Ronnie Drew's cancer condition. It was recorded at Windmill Lane on 14 and 15 January 2008. "The Ballad of Ronnie Drew" is available as a CD in Ireland only. Ronnie Drew died a few months after the release of the single in August 2008.

Glen Hansard's vocals on the record were recorded over the telephone, and not in person, as he was in the United States for the 80th Academy Awards.

Track listing

Contributing artists

Mary Black
Paul Brady
Moya Brennan
Chris de Burgh
Eamonn Campbell
Paddy Casey
Andrea Corr
Mary Coughlan
Damien Dempsey
Christy Dignam
The Edge
Gavin Friday
Bob Geldof
Glen Hansard
Robert Hunter
Ronan Keating
Kíla
Barney McKenna
Matt Molloy
Christy Moore
Shane MacGowan
Mundy
Joe Elliot
Eleanor McEvoy
Sinéad O'Connor
Declan O'Rourke
John Sheahan
Duke Special
Patsy Watchorn

Chart information

References

2008 singles
Charity singles
Irish novelty songs
Irish Singles Chart number-one singles
Songs written by Bono
Songs written by the Edge
U2 songs
Universal Music Group singles
Songs with lyrics by Robert Hunter (lyricist)
Song recordings produced by John Reynolds
2008 songs